Serge Hissung (born 19 September 1953) is a French bobsledder. He competed in the two man and the four man events at the 1976 Winter Olympics.

References

1953 births
Living people
French male bobsledders
Olympic bobsledders of France
Bobsledders at the 1976 Winter Olympics
Place of birth missing (living people)